Matters Arising from the Identification of the Body is a science fiction / crime novella by Simon Petrie. It was published by Peggy Bright Books in 2017.

Plot summary 
The novella is set on the Saturnian moon Titan. It concerns an investigation into the troubling death, by exposure to Titan's atmosphere, of a young woman, Tanja Morgenstein, the daughter of wealthy and influential industrialist Joshua Hainan. The investigation, conducted by caseworker Guerline Scarfe, begins with an evidence-supported presumption that the death was a suicide, but anomalies are uncovered as the various persons of interest in Ms Morgenstein's life are interviewed.

Awards and nominations 
 2017 shortlisted Aurealis Award for Best Science Fiction Novella
 2018 nominated Ditmar Award for Best Novella or Novelette
 2018 winner Sir Julius Vogel Award for Best Novella or Novelette

References 

2017 short stories
New Zealand science fiction
Australian science fiction